Patrick McGinley (born 1937) is an Irish novelist, born in Glencolumbkille, Ireland.

After teaching in Ireland, McGinley moved to England in the 1960s and settled in Kent. He pursued a career as a publisher and author.  Among his strongest literary influences is his Irish predecessor, author Flann O'Brien, who McGinley emulates most noticeably in his novel The Devil's Diary.

Bibliography
McGinley's novels include:
Bogmail (1978)
Foxprints (1982)
Goosefoot (1983)
Foggage (1983)<ref>{{Cite news|url=https://www.nytimes.com/1983/12/25/books/siblings-in-love.html|title=Siblings in Love|last=Morning|first=Mordecai Richler Was Thinking In Bed This|date=1983-12-25|work=The New York Times|access-date=2019-08-06|last2=Maid|first2=Said Maureen I'Ll Bet the Neighbors See Me As An Old|language=en-US|issn=0362-4331|last3=Yes|first3=You As A. Sapless Bachelor do They Know That There'S More Heat In This House Than In All the Other Houses of the Townland Put Together  Little|last4=Indeed|last5=Kevin|first5=But There Is A. Problem In This Irish Arcadia Forty-Year-Old|last6=Brother|first6=Maureen Are Twin|last7=Sister|last8=Incest|last9=Him|first9=Kevin'S Conscience Tells}}</ref>The Trick of the Ga Bolga (1986)The Red Men (1987)The Devil's Diary (1988)The Lost Soldier's Song'' (1994)

References

1937 births
Living people
Irish novelists
Irish male novelists